The BMW E39 is the fourth generation of the BMW 5 Series range of executive cars, which was manufactured from 1995 to 2004. It was launched in the sedan body style, with the station wagon body style (marketed as "Touring") introduced in 1996. The E39 was replaced by the E60 5 Series in 2003, however E39 Touring models remained in production until May 2004.

The proportion of chassis components using aluminium significantly increased for the E39, and it was the first 5 Series to use aluminium for all major components in the front suspension or any in the rear. It was also the first 5 Series where a four-cylinder diesel engine was available. Rack and pinion steering was used for four- and six-cylinder models, the first time that a 5 Series has used this steering system in significant volumes. Unlike its E34 predecessor and E60 successor, the E39 was not available with all-wheel drive.

The high performance E39 M5 sedan was introduced in 1998, powered by a  DOHC V8 engine. It was the first M5 model to be powered by a V8 engine.

Development and launch 

Development for the E34's successor began in 1989, and ended in 1995. The final design by Joji Nagashima was selected in June 1992 and later frozen for production under new design chief Chris Bangle. With design selection in 1992, the series development phase began and took 39 months until start of production. The domestic German design patent was filed on 20 April 1994, with an E39 prototype.

In May 1995 BMW published the first official photos of the E39. The E39 premiered in September 1995 at the Frankfurt Motor Show. In December 1995 sales of sedan models began on the European mainland. Production of wagon/estate models began in November 1996.

Body styles

Equipment 

The E39 was one of the first vehicles (alongside the E38 7 Series) to have curtain airbags, which protect the occupants' heads in a side impact. Standard equipment on the launch models included dual front and side airbags, pretensioners and load limiters for the front seatbelts, anti-lock brakes, traction control, power steering, and air conditioning. Satellite navigation was also available, initially using maps on CD-ROMs, then moving to DVD maps in 2002. Several models were available in Sports or Executive trim levels.

Special options available options on wagon models were either a roller blind or extending cargo cover with patrician net for the rear cargo area, roller sun visors for rear and side windows.

A "latent heat accumulator" was available as an option up until September 1999. The accumulator stores engine heat by converting a salt from solid to liquid form (phase transition). The insulated tank can store heat for several days. The next time the vehicle is started, this heat is automatically used to reduce exhaust emissions (by heating the engine up to operating temperature quicker), for cabin heating and window defrosting.

Separate to the latent heat accumulator is the Residual Heat function (activated by a button labelled "REST"), which allows the demister and cabin heater to use the heat of an engine that has recently been turned off (using an electric pump to push hot coolant through the heater core).

Engines

Petrol engines 

At launch, the petrol engines consisted of the BMW M52 straight-6 engines and the BMW M62 V8 engines. In late 1998, the "technical update" (TÜ) versions of these engines were introduced, introducing double VANOS to the M52 and single VANOS to the M62, primarily to increase torque at low rpm. 

For the facelift of the model range in the year 2000, the M52 was replaced by the BMW M54 straight-6 engine and the version used in the 530i model topped the Ward's 10 Best Engines list in 2002 and 2003. The post-facelift V8 models (535i and 540i) continued to use the M62TÜ engine.

Specifications for European models are shown below.,,

Diesel engines 

The initial diesel models used the BMW M51 turbocharged straight-6 engine carried over from its predecessor. In 1998, its successor the BMW M57 was introduced in the 530d model, however the BMW M51 engine continued to be used for two more years in the 525td and 525tds models.

In 1999, the M47 four-cylinder turbo-diesel was introduced in the 520d model, which is the only E39 model to use a four-cylinder engine.

Specifications for European models are shown below.,,

Drivetrain

Manual transmissions 
Six-cylinder petrol models were fitted with either the 5-speed Getrag 250G or ZF 320Z (S5-32) transmission, depending on the year and model. Diesel models with the M51 engine were fitted with the 5-speed ZF 260Z transmission, while the M57 diesel models were fitted with the 5-speed ZF 390 (S5-39DZ) transmission. V8 petrol models were fitted with the 6-speed Getrag 420G transmission.

Automatic transmissions 

Some pre-facelift six-cylinder petrol models were fitted with the 4-speed GM 4L30-E (A4S270R) transmission. Six-cylinder pre-facelift cars built for the Japanese market were fitted with the Jatco 5R01 5 speed automatic transmission. All other six-cylinder models were fitted with 5-speed transmissions, either the GM 5L40-E (A5S360R), GM 5L40-E (A5S390R), or ZF 5HP19 (A5S325Z) transmission, depending on the year and model. V8 petrol models were fitted with either the 5-speed ZF 5HP24 (A5S440Z) or the 5-speed ZF 5HP30 (A5S560Z).

Differential ratios 
The following differential ratios were used by the E39:
 2.35: 530d manual
 2.64: 525tds automatic
 2.81: 540i manual, 530d automatic
 2.93: 528i/530i manual
 3.07: 528iT/530iT manual
 3.15: 525i/525tds manual, 540i automatic
 3.15 (LSD): M5
 3.23: 525iT manual
 3.46: 525i/528i/530i (5-speed) automatic
 4.10: 528i (4-speed) automatic

Steering 
Unusually, two different steering systems were used for the E39, depending on the engine. Models with four-cylinder and six-cylinder models use rack and pinion steering, the first time this system has been used in a 5 Series (except for the E34 525iX model). This system steers from the front of the axle.

Models with V8 engines use recirculating ball steering, as per the previous generations of 5 Series.

Chassis and body 
Torsional rigidity was increased over the E34 by 40 percent, which reduces body flex and allows the suspension to operate more accurately, also improving ride quality. Structural dynamics were also an objective of the body design, so the body's frequencies for torsional twisting and bending are in separate ranges and above the natural frequency of the body. These frequencies are out of the range of engine and driveline vibrations, to avoid vibrations being amplified.

The wagon version was  longer than the previous generation (E34) and weighed approximately  more.

Suspension 
The E39 was the first 5 Series to use aluminium for most components in the front suspension. The proportion of chassis components using aluminium significantly increased for the E39.

The front suspension consists of a double-jointed version of the MacPherson strut, with six-cylinder cars using an aluminium front subframe. V8 models also use aluminium in the steering box and several suspension links, to compensate for the heavier steel subframe.

The rear suspension consists of a four link design (called "Z-link"), which is similar to the system used by the E38 7 Series. The design minimises unintentional toe angle changes, which increases the stability of the handling.

Wagon self-levelling suspension 
The Touring model was the first BMW model to use air suspension (self-levelling suspension was first used by BMW for the E23 7 Series with a closed-loop nitrogen system that operated in parallel with the steel springs). This "self leveling" system controls the ride height of the rear of the vehicle and is designed to keep the center of the wheel a specified distance from the lip of the fender as the weight of the load in the cargo area varies.

Instead of using a traditional coil springs, the system uses pneumatic springs paired with air reservoirs that are pressurised by an air compressor. The system is controlled by two Hall effect sensors at the rear of the vehicle. These sensors tell the EHC (electric height control) if the rear ride height needs to be adjusted and adjust headlight height for vehicles equipped with Xenon headlights. When a door or the rear hatch is opened and then closed the control module will constantly monitor the input signals from the HALL sensors and will activate a correction if the ride height has change greater than 10mm. During normal operation the system stays online but does not adjust to conditions such as potholes.

M5 model 

The M5 model of the E39 was introduced in 1998 at the Geneva Motor Show and was produced from 1998 to 2003. It was powered by the S62 V8 engine. All E39 M5 cars were sold in the sedan body style with a 6-speed manual transmission.

Special models

Alpina B10 and D10 

The Alpina B10 3.2, 3.3, V8 and V8S petrol-engined models were built in sedans and wagon body styles based on the E39 from January 1997 to May 2004.

The Alpina D10 was the first diesel model produced by Alpina and was introduced in February 2000.

Protection line 
The 540i Protection light-armored vehicle was launched in Europe in September 1997 and in North America from January 1998. These models included aramid fiber armor, bullet-resistant glass that is coated with polycarbonate to reduce spall. The 540i Protection is rated to withstand the impact of handgun fire up to and including .44 Magnum, the glass is also protected from attack with blunt objects such as baseball bats and bricks. The additional security measures brought an additional weight of  compared to the normal 540i sedan. on request, an intercom system was available and from January 1998 run-flat tyres were available.

Model year changes 

Most changes occur in September each year, when the changes for the following model year go into production, as is typical BMW practice. Therefore, the changes for 1996 represent the 1997 model year, for example.

1996 
 Station wagon (estate, marketed as "Touring") body style introduced.
 525td model introduced.

1997 
 On-board computer upgraded.
 Cornering Brake Control introduced.
 Rear side airbags introduced.

1998 
 M5 model introduced. Lower-body rear side airbags were standard on the M5, remaining optional for other models.
 M52 straight-six engines updated to M52TU.
 M62 V8 engines updated to M62TU.
 530d model introduced, using the new M57 straight-six turbo-diesel engine.
 Xenon headlights introduced.
 Parking sensors ("Park Distance Control") introduced.
 Self-levelling rear suspension introduced for Estate models.
 Stability control upgraded (from ASC+T to DSC).
 Self-Adjusting Clutch (SAC) introduced on the straight-six petrol engines.
 Air conditioning, electric rear windows and on board computer added to standard equipment
 Satellite navigation upgraded from MKI (or Mark I) to MKII. Like the MKI, the MKII uses a 4:3 screen and stores the maps on a CD.

1999 
 Rain-sensing windshield wipers introduced (June 1999)
 Front seat airbags upgraded to dual stage
 520d model (using M47 inline-four engine) introduced, replaces the 525td model (M51 engine).
 525d model (using M57 engine) replaces the 525tds model (M51 engine).

2000 facelift 
The E39 facelift (also known as LCI) models began production in September 2000 (for the 2001 model year).

 520i, 525i and 530i models (using M54 engines) replace the 520i, 523i and 528i model (M52TU engines).
 530d model receives power increase.
 Kidney grilles on all models are changed to those of the M5.
 Revised "angel eye" headlights.
 Revised tail lights with LED running lights.
 Navigation screen updated from 4:3 to larger 16:9 widescreen.

2001 
 Automatic transmission cars had the manual shift direction switched (to forwards for downshifts, backwards for upshifts).
 Front brakes were upgraded with 324mm discs and new calipers on 6 cylinder models.
 Automatic headlights introduced.
 In-dash CD player becomes standard equipment on all models.
 Power passenger seat becomes standard on 6 cylinder models and automatic climate control becomes standard on 525i.
 M Sport package introduced for the 540i

2002 
 Navigation computer updated to “Mk IV” Used 2 DVD maps instead of 8 CDs).

2003 
 Additional chrome trim added on the trunk (boot) and on the sides of the body.

Country-specific model ranges

Indonesia 
In Indonesia, the initial model range in 1996 was the 523i and 528i, with only the 523i available with a manual transmission. Following the September 2000 facelift, the line-up consisted of 520i, 525i and 530i. Indonesian models were assembled in Jakarta from complete knock-down kits.

United States 
From 1997 to 1998, the E39 model range in North America consisted of the 528i and 540i, In 1999 the M5 was introduced along with station wagon (marketed as "sports wagon") versions of the 528i and 540i. For the 2001 model year, the 528i was discontinued and replaced by the 525i (525i Touring in estate/wagon format) and 530i (with no wagon variant in the US).

All North American models from factory arrived pre-wired for mobile phones; it was a dealer option to have a mobile phone installed into the center console. The station wagon models were marketed as "Sports Wagon" and standard features included roof rails for mounting a roof rack.

In 2003 BMW sold the 540i M-Sport package as a limited production model in the United States, with 1,190 cars produced with a manual transmission. Upgrades included 18-inch wheels and various cosmetic features.

Sales in the United States for May 1999 to May 2000 were 19,294 vehicles. The following year, sales for May 2000 to May 2001 were 15,233 vehicles.

Motorsport
The M5 was used by several teams in the Italian Superstars Series.

Awards 
Car and Driver featured the E39 in its "10Best list" six consecutive times, from 1997 to 2002. In 2001, Consumer Reports gave the 530i its highest car rating ever, declaring it the best car they had ever reviewed to date.

Other reviewers have also praised the E39 models.

Safety

The series tested for IIHS's "moderate overlap front" test and received 'Good' rating results, the highest available.

Production 
The first pilot production models were built in February 1995, with full-scale production starting in September that year. Most cars were built at the Dingolfing factory, with complete knock-down assembly used in Mexico, Indonesia and Russia. CKD production amounted to 17,280, with total production numbering 1,488,038 of which 266,209 units were Touring models.

References 

Euro NCAP executive cars
5 Series
Cars introduced in 1995
2000s cars